William Thornton MM (3 March 1920 – 26 August 1991) was a Scottish footballer and manager. Thornton's entire senior playing career was spent with Rangers, and Thornton is considered to be one of the greatest players in the club's history.

Football career
Thornton played for Rangers from 1936 to 1954, then became a manager with first Dundee and then Partick Thistle. Thornton later returned to Rangers as assistant manager to Davie White in the summer of 1968 and was briefly caretaker manager in 1969 after White's dismissal. Thornton then worked as assistant to William Waddell until 1972. The club won the two matches when Thornton was in charge. Thornton is one of Scotland's all-time top goalscorers, with 138 league goals.

Military career
Thornton served in World War II in the Scottish Horse fighting in the Italian campaign at the battle of Anzio, and winning the Military Medal for his bravery during the invasion of Sicily. Later in the war, Thornton played football for a British Eighth Army team that also included George Hamilton and Tom Finney.

Death
Thornton died on 26 August 1991, aged 71 years old.

Honours

Manager
Dundee
Forfarshire Cup : 1954–55, 1955–56

References

External links

1920 births
1991 deaths
Scottish footballers
Scotland international footballers
Rangers F.C. players
Dundee F.C. managers
Scottish Football League players
Scottish football managers
Partick Thistle F.C. managers
British Army personnel of World War II
Rangers F.C. non-playing staff
Scottish Horse soldiers
Scottish Football League representative players
Scottish Football League managers
Scotland wartime international footballers
Association football forwards
Place of death missing
People from Winchburgh
Footballers from West Lothian